Bad Kids of Crestview Academy is a 2017 American action comedy thriller film directed by Ben Browder. It is a sequel to the 2012 film Bad Kids Go to Hell. The screenplay was written by Barry Wernick and James R. Hallam. It is based on Wernick and Matthew Spradlin's best-selling graphic novel Bad Kids Go 2 Hell a book about the stories of the Wildman and Calloway children at an evil prep school.  The film stars Sammi Hanratty, Colby Arps, Sophia Taylor Ali, Erika Daly, Matthew Frias, Sean Astin, Gina Gershon, Ben Browder, Sufe Bradshaw, and Cameron Deane Stewart.

Overview
Wernick and Hallam had written the 2009 graphic novel Bad Kids Go to Hell, which was turned into the 2012 film Bad Kids Go to Hell, both telling the story of Matt Clark, a student at prestigious Crestview Academy who is the only survivor of six students serving a weekend detention.

The story in Bad Kids of Crestview Academy takes place five years later, when another group of detention students are slaughtered. Browder reprises his role as Max the janitor, in addition to serving as director of the film. In an end-scene cameo, Cameron Deane Stewart reprises his role as Matt Clark, protagonist of the original film.

Cast
 Sammi Hanratty as Siouxsie Hess ("Undercrust")
 Colby Arps as Blaine Wilkes ("Mr. Clean")
 Sophia Taylor Ali as Faith Jackson ("Preacher's Daughter")
 Erika Daly as Sara Hasegawa ("Cat Lover")
 Matthew Frias as Brian Marquez ("Latin Spice")
 Ben Browder as Max (school janitor)
 Sufe Bradshaw as Dr. Knight (Dean of Students)
 Ashlyn McEvers as Alyson Hess (Siouxsie's dead sister)
 Alexandra "Ali" Astin as Ethel Balducci
 Sean Astin as Headmaster Nash
 Drake Bell as Ben, aka "The Naked Wizard"
 Gina Gershon as Senator Wilkes
 Cameron Deane Stewart as Matt Clark (accused in the 2011 killings)

References

External links
 
 
 
 

2017 films
2017 comedy-drama films
American comedy-drama films
2010s English-language films
Films set in Dallas
Films shot in Austin, Texas
American fantasy comedy films
American comedy horror films
American black comedy films
Films based on American comics
Live-action films based on comics
2017 comedy horror films
2017 black comedy films
2010s American films